In the history of the United States, there have been approximately 32 unsuccessful recess appointments to United States federal courts. 22 individuals have been appointed to a United States federal court through a recess appointment who were thereafter rejected by the United States Senate when their name was formally submitted in nomination, either by a vote rejecting the nominee, or by the failure of the Senate to act on the nomination. These individuals served as federal judges, having full authority to hold office and issue rulings, until their rejection by the Senate. Five individuals were appointed but resigned either before the Senate voted on their nomination, or before a formal nomination was even submitted. Another five individuals were appointed but never assumed the office.

Constitutional background
Article II, Section 2, Clause 3 of the United States Constitution states:

The president may fill critical federal executive and judicial branch vacancies unilaterally but temporarily when the Senate is in recess, and thus unavailable to provide advice and consent. Such appointments expire at the end of the next Senate session. To continue to serve thereafter, the appointee must be formally nominated by the president and confirmed by the Senate.

History of use
John Rutledge, appointed by George Washington was the first recess appointment to be rejected by the Senate, and the only recess appointee to the Supreme Court of the United States to be rejected. Washington appointed Rutledge on July 1, 1795, but because of Rutledge's political views and occasional mental illness, the Senate rejected his nomination December 15, 1795. Rutledge subsequently attempted suicide, and then resigned on December 28, 1795. The 4th United States Congress remained in session until June 1, 1796, so Rutledge could have remained on the Court until then, but chose not to.

Wallace McCamant, appointed by Calvin Coolidge on May 25, 1925, to the United States Court of Appeals for the Ninth Circuit, was the lone recess appointment to a United States Court of Appeals to be rejected by the Senate. The Senate rejected his nomination on March 17, 1926, and he resigned on May 2, 1926.

In total, fourteen presidents have had recess appointments rejected. William Howard Taft - who only made six recess appointments to the federal bench - experienced the largest number of rejected recess appointments, with three. Harry S. Truman - who made a record 38 such appointments - also had three recess appointments rejected, but one of those was later reappointed and confirmed. Taft had also used recess appointments to reappoint two judges whose recess appointments by Theodore Roosevelt had been rejected; both appointees resigned from their positions before their names were formally submitted into nomination.

Unsuccessful U.S. district court recess appointments

Recess appointees to the United States district courts not subsequently confirmed by the Senate are as follows:

Notes

References
 Federal Judicial Center